The fifth season of The Rockford Files originally aired Fridays at 9:00-10:00 pm on NBC from September 22, 1978 to April 13, 1979.

Episodes

1978 American television seasons
1979 American television seasons
The Rockford Files seasons